Selma is a town in Johnston County, North Carolina, United States. In 2010, the population was 6,073, and as of 2018 the estimated population was 6,913. Selma is part of the Raleigh-Durham-Cary Combined Statistical Area. The area has a population over 1.7 million residents, though the town of Selma is able to maintain its rural character. The Everitt P. Stevens House, located in Selma, was the site of the last Grand Review of the Confederate Army held on April 6, 1865, after its defeat at the Battle of Bentonville.

Geography
Selma is located in central Johnston County at  (35.536982, -78.284642). It is bordered to the southwest by Smithfield, the county seat, and to the northwest by Wilson's Mills.

Demographics

2020 census

As of the 2020 United States census, there were 6,317 people, 2,311 households, and 1,480 families residing in the town.

2000 census
As of the census of 2000, there were 5,914 people, 2,254 households, and 1,480 families residing in the town. The population density was 1,830.6 people per square mile (706.9/km). There were 2,515 housing units at an average density of 778.5 per square mile (300.6/km). The racial makeup of the town was 47.09% White, 40.33% Black, 0.57% Indian, 0.19% Asian, 0.08% Pacific Islander, 9.89% from other races, and 1.84% from two or more races. Hispanics or Latinos of any race were 19.02% of the population.

There were 2,254 households, out of which 31.9% had children under the age of 18 living with them, 38.1% were married couples living together, 21.3% had a female householder with no husband present, and 34.3% were non-families. 28.7% of all households were made up of individuals, and 11.8% had someone living alone who was 65 years of age or older. The average household size was 2.61 and the average family size was 3.17.

In the town, the population was spread out, with 27.9% under the age of 18, 11.6% from 18 to 24, 28.6% from 25 to 44, 20.4% from 45 to 64, and 11.5% who were 65 years of age or older. The median age was 31 years. For every 100 females, there were 94.2 males. For every 100 females age 18 and over, there were 88.8 males.

The median income for a household in the town was $23,856 and the median income for a family was $32,430. Males had a median income of $26,886 versus $21,453 for females. The per capita income for the town was $12,101. About 23.1% of families and 30.0% of the population were below the poverty line, including 45.9% of those under age 18 and 22.1% of those age 65 or over.

Religion
Approximately 36% of people in Selma are affiliated with a religion. The predominant religion in Selma is Christianity, with the largest numbers of adherents being Baptist (15.64%) and Methodist (6.02%). Others include Pentecostal (4.02%), Roman Catholic (2.52%) and Presbyterian (1.46%).

Law and government
Selma operates under a council-manager government. The town council consists of the mayor and four council members. All four council members are elected at-large.
 Byron McAllister, Mayor
 Joe Scarboro, Council Member and Mayor Pro-tem
 Amy West Whitley, Council Member
 Bruce Edward McKay, PA, Council Member
 William Overby, Council Member
The council sets policy and the manager oversees day-to-day operations. The town manager is Brent Taylor.

Transportation

Air
Johnston County Airport (IATA: JNX, ICAO: KJNX, FAA LID: JNX) is a general aviation airport located approximately seven miles west of Selma, in Smithfield.

Raleigh-Durham International Airport (IATA: RDU, ICAO: KRDU, FAA LID: RDU) is the region's primary airport, located approximately 40 miles northwest of Selma, between Raleigh and Durham.

Designated routes and highways
 Interstate Highway
  (future)
 
 U.S. Highways:
  
  (named Pollock Street)
 North Carolina Highways:
  
  
Interstate 95 runs along the southern edge of the town, with access from Exit 97 (U.S. Route 70) and Exit 98 (Pine Level–Selma Road). I-95 leads northeast  to Rocky Mount and southwest  to Fayetteville. U.S. Route 301 (Pollock Street) runs through the center of Selma, leading northeast  to Wilson and southwest  to the center of Smithfield. US 70 runs along the southwestern edge of Selma, leading northwest  to Raleigh and southeast  to Goldsboro. North Carolina Highway 96 leads north from the center of Selma  to Zebulon.

Passenger rail service
Amtrak's Palmetto and Carolinian passenger trains stop at the historic Selma Union Depot. They offer service to Charlotte, New York City, Savannah, and intermediate points.

Commercial rail service
 CSX Transportation
 Norfolk Southern Railway

Public transit
The Johnston County Area Transit System (JCATS) is a coordinated transit system that provides transportation services in Selma and throughout Johnston County.

History

On May 1, 1867, lots were sold around a newly established station on the North Carolina Railroad. From those lots, the town was built and considered a railroad town for many decades. Selma was officially chartered as a town on February 11, 1873. The town recently renovated its 1924 passenger depot, which has Amtrak service. The town is also home to the Mitchener Station, which was built in 1855 and is thought to be the oldest surviving train station in North Carolina. After Interstate 95 was built in the late 1950s, the town experienced growth due to its location next to the interstate. Today, there are many hotels and restaurants located in the area thanks to the traffic from I-95.

The Downtown Selma Historic District, Noah Edward Edgerton House, Richard B. Harrison School, Nowell-Mayerburg-Oliver House, William E. Smith House, Everitt P. Stevens House, Selma Union Depot, and West Selma Historic District are listed on the National Register of Historic Places.

Education
Selma is home to two schools within the Johnston County School District:
 Selma Elementary School
 Selma Middle School

Mitchner University Academy is a private, non-traditional school offering K-12 education.

Culture

Museums
 Historic Union Station
 Max G. Creech Selma Historical Museum

Performing Arts
Rudy Theatre, Live@The Rudy, Selma, NC
 Rudy Theatre / Live at The Rudy

Media

Television
Selma is part of the Raleigh-Durham-Fayetteville Designated Market Area. The following station has broadcast facilities in the city:
 WNGT-CD

Newspapers
There are several newspapers and periodicals serving the city:
 The News & Observer, daily
 Johnstonian News, weekly
 The Smithfield Herald, weekly

Radio stations
Selma is part of the Raleigh-Durham Arbitron radio market. The following stations transmit from the city:
 WTSB (1090 AM)

Notable people
 Myrtle Cagle, pilot and member of Mercury 13 female astronaut program
 Seby B. Jones, former mayor of Raleigh, North Carolina
 Drique London (born Madrique Sanders), rapper and hip hop artist
 Lunsford Richardson, founder of the Vick Chemical Company, maker of cold remedies such as Vicks Cough Drops

References

External links

 Town of Selma official website
 Selma visitor information
 Selma/Johnston County Visitor Bureau
 Selma, NC skycam

1867 establishments in North Carolina
Populated places established in 1867
Populated places on the Neuse River
Towns in Johnston County, North Carolina
Towns in North Carolina